Simeonie Amagoalik (May 1, 1933 – March 2, 2011) was  an Inuit carver from Resolute, Nunavut, Canada.

Career 
Amagoalik was born May 1, 1933, in Inukjuak, Northern Quebec. He started carving at the age of 14 on soapstone and tusks after learning from an American working for the Hudson's Bay Company. In 1953, Amagoalik and his family along with 10 other Inuit families were sent to Resolute. He met his wife, Eetoolook, in 1963 when they were both being treated for tuberculosis.

Amagoalik was involved in the early negotiations of the Nunavut Land Claims Agreement. Along with Looty Pijamini in Grise Fiord, Nunavut, Amagoalik was commissioned by the Canadian government to build a monument to the High Arctic relocation which took place in 1955. Amagoalik's monument is located in Resolute.

References

External links
 

1933 births
2011 deaths
Artists from Nunavut
Artists from Quebec
Inuit from Quebec
20th-century Canadian sculptors
Inuit sculptors
People from Resolute
People from Nunavik
21st-century Canadian sculptors
Deaths from cancer in Canada